Andrew Pifko is a Canadian actor, who has worked on numerous projects since beginning his career in 1999.

Career
Andrew has both appeared as and voiced various characters in several TV series such as Queer as Folk, Rescue Heroes, and 'Til Death Do Us Part. He also voiced the playable character Aldo Trapani in The Godfather video game, which are based on the film The Godfather.

Personal life
He is the older brother of actress Cara Pifko.

Filmography

Film

Television

Video games

References

External links
 
 

Living people
Canadian male film actors
Canadian male television actors
Canadian male voice actors
Canadian people of Polish descent
Canadian people of French descent
Jewish Canadian male actors 
Year of birth missing (living people)